Ninefold was a cloud computing company which provided infrastructure as a service (IaaS). Ninefold was headquartered in Sydney, Australia and was backed by Macquarie Telecom, an ASX-listed Australian B2B telecommunications company.

History and growth

Launch 

Ninefold was founded by Macquarie Telecom in 2011 to meet a growing demand for cloud computing in Australia. The company provided virtual servers from 2011 until it stopped trading a few years later.

Services 

Ninefold offered self-managed virtual servers.

Virtual Servers 

Ninefold’s customers were able to provision virtual servers via an online portal.

Australian Federal Government Hosting 

On 26 June 2013, Ninefold became a member of the Data Centre as a Service (DCaaS) Multi-User List, which is published by the Australian Government Department of Finance. On 13 February 2015, Ninefold was listed as a product available to Federal Government agencies through Macquarie Telecom.

Docker Support 

On 10 June 2014, Ninefold commenced support of Docker with the announcement that Docker 1.0.0  was available.

Competitors 

 AppScale
 Heroku
 Engine Yard
 OpenShift
 Amazon Web Services
 DigitalOcean

References

External links 
 .
 .

Cloud platforms
Cloud computing providers
Internet technology companies of Australia